The David McKenzie Log Cabin is a historic house located within the Mountain Homeplace in Staffordsville, Kentucky, United States. The cabin was built between 1860 and 1865 by David McKenzie, who was an early settler of Johnson County. It was added to the National Register of Historic Places on January 26, 1982.

It is not known if the structure was originally a double-pen structure as it is today or whether the eastern pen, constructed of poplar, was built first followed by the addition of the western pen, which is of yellow pine. The walls are built of hewn logs with dovetail notching. The cabin rests on sandstone piers and contains a central fireplace, which is also made of sandstone.

See also

National Register of Historic Places listings in Johnson County, Kentucky
Mountain Homeplace

References

National Register of Historic Places in Johnson County, Kentucky
Log cabins in the United States
Houses in Johnson County, Kentucky
Houses on the National Register of Historic Places in Kentucky
Log buildings and structures on the National Register of Historic Places in Kentucky
Relocated buildings and structures in Kentucky
1860s establishments in Kentucky